"Sippy Cup" is a song by American recording artist Melanie Martinez, released as the third single from her debut album, Cry Baby. A music video featuring fashion designer Stella Rose Saint Clair was released July 29, 2015.

Background and composition
In the interview with SPIN, Martinez described "Sippy Cup" as the second part to "Dollhouse", stating: "The song is basically the bridge between the Dollhouse EP and the Cry Baby album. This song is about what actually 'goes down in the kitchen', a deeper look into Crybaby's family life." The song is composed in G minor.

Music video
 
Martinez further explores the character of Cry Baby and her home life in "Sippy Cup", showing just how serious her parents' problems are. No matter how much her mother tries to hide her alcoholism, Cry Baby knows that she is hiding liquor in her sippy cup. When the drunk mother sees her husband with another woman, she ties both of them up, murders them, and covers the bodies up with a bloody sheet. Cry Baby then walks in on the crime scene; shocked and overwhelmed by the sight, she begins to panic. Her mother puts her to sleep and when she awakens, Cry Baby is chained to her own bed. To cover up the murder, her mother drugs her so she would forget the gruesome memory.

Charts

Certifications

Release history

Notes

References

2015 singles
2015 songs
Melanie Martinez songs
Atlantic Records singles
Songs written by Melanie Martinez
Songs written by One Love (record producer)
Songs written by Kinetics (rapper)
Songs about child abuse
Songs about alcohol
Songs about infidelity
Murder ballads